Ancula mapae is a species of sea slug, a dorid nudibranch, a marine gastropod mollusc in the family Goniodorididae.

Distribution
This species was first described from Victoria, Australia.

Description
This goniodorid nudibranch is translucent white in colour with brown patches or stripes composed of small brown spots interspersed with white pigment. The pre-rhinophoral papillae, extra-branchial papillae and tail have a band of yellow before the tip. There are two extra-branchial papillae which are strongly tapered to a point.

Ecology
Ancula mapae probably feeds on Entoprocta which often grow on hydroids, bryozoa and other living substrata.

References

Goniodorididae
Gastropods described in 1961